The Catania Metro is a rapid transit system serving the coastal city of Catania, Sicily, in Southern Italy. It is the southernmost metro system in Europe, the only one in Sicily, and one of the seven Italian metro systems.

The Catania Metro has been in operation since 27 June 1999.

History and construction
The section of the line between the stations of Borgo and Porto originally belonged to the Ferrovia Circumetnea narrow-gauge regional railway which opened to traffic in 1895.

Thus, the narrow-gauge Circumetnea railway's original terminus at Catania Porto had to be moved to Borgo due to the development of the Catania Metro.

The Metropolitana and the Circumetnea railways are operated by the same company, which has its offices at Catania Borgo.

Current service

During the first years of operation, this metro suffered from poor ridership, as its former route (from 1999 to 2016) merely skirted the city centre and therefore did not reach many popular destinations. However, ridership increased significantly in 2017. The metro usually operates every day. Trains run every 10 minutes until 3:00 p.m. and then every 15 minutes until the end of the service, at 10 p.m.

Tickets
All tickets (except MetroBus tickets) may be purchased at ticket machines at every station.

 90min: €1
 DayTicket: €2
 MetroBus Ticket: €1.20
 30days Ticket: €15

List of stations
 Nesima
 San Nullo
 Cibali
 Milo
 Borgo
 Giuffrida
 Italia
 Galatea
 Stazione FS (closed 2016)
 Porto (suspended 2016)
 Giovanni XXIII
 Stesicoro

Future service and planned extensions

An extension to the system was approved on 30 March 2006. It involves a branch from the existing line at Galatea westward through the city centre, which is planned eventually to reach Catania's Fontanarossa airport to the south. This solution was favored over proposals for an airport link by means of a new station on the Catania-Siracusa line, which runs past the airport and is part of the national rail network. Recent underground stations at Piazza Papa Giovanni XXIII and Corso Sicilia, near Piazza Stesicoro, among others, serve the city center since 20 December 2016 while the new track Borgo-Nesima (four new stations) opened in March 2017.

Another extension, westward from the current terminal at Nesima, is also under construction as far as Misterbianco, toward the north-western border of the city. It is planned to open in 2020.

Rolling stock

E100 Series (E101-E103, 3 units) -  Stanga-TIBB electric single-units railcars bought-second hand from the Ferrovia Centrale Umbra.Used as temporary rolling stock between 1999 and 2001.

M.88 Series (M.88-01 to M.88-08, 8 two-car sets) - Two-car electric multiple units built by Firema between 2001 and 2011. Mainstay of the line since 2001. Originally, each of them had a name.

CT1 Series (2 two-car sets in service, 25 others on order) - Two-car electric multiple units built by Titagarh-Firema. A total of 27 two-car units have been ordered in 2018. First train in service since the 1st of April 2022.

See also
 Ferrovia Circumetnea
 Lists of rapid transit systems

References

External links

 Official site of FCE (Catania Metro operator)
 Comune di Catania - Ferrovia Circumetnea - Metropolitana di Catania - La Linea Metropolitana 
 Metropolitana di Catania
 Catania Metro at Urbanrail.net

 
Railway lines in Sicily
1999 establishments in Italy
Railway lines opened in 1999
3000 V DC railway electrification